An argumentum ad crumenam argument, also known as an argument to the purse, is the informal fallacy of concluding that a statement is correct because the speaker is rich (or that a statement is incorrect because the speaker is poor).

The opposite is the argumentum ad lazarum.

Examples:
"If you're so smart, why aren't you rich?"
"This new law is a good idea. Most of the people against it are riff-raff who make less than $20,000 a year."
"Warren Buffett is hosting a seminar. This seminar is better than others, because Warren Buffett is richer than most people."

References

Genetic fallacies
Latin philosophical phrases
Latin logical phrases
Wealth